Munnar is a 2009 Tamil-language thriller film directed by K. Thambi Durai. The film stars Ranjith, Prem and K. Thambi Durai. The film had musical score by Devendran and was released on 2 October 2009.

Plot

Vaithyaraman (R. Sundarrajan) is looking for his brother Chandra Mouli (K. Thambi Durai) who went missing during his honeymoon. Chandra Mouli's wife Sandhya (Reethima) is admitted into a mental hospital. The CBI officer Karthikeyan (Ranjith) is assigned to find Chandra Mouli.

Cast

Ranjith as Karthikeyan
Prem as Shankar
K. Thambi Durai as Chandra Mouli
Ragasya as Vandana
Reethima as Sandhya
K. R. Vijaya as a judge
Vadivukkarasi as Sandhya's mother
R. Sundarrajan as Vaithyaraman
Vaiyapuri as Kanagavel
O. A. K. Sundar as Kathirvel
Mahanadi Shankar as Inspector Rajakumaran
Master Karthik
Thideer Kanniah
Kovai Senthil

Production
K. Thambi Durai, a former assistant director to Seventh Channel's Manickam Narayanan, announced the film with Riyaz Khan to play the second hero in the film. Music is by Devendran and the camera work is by C. Marimuthu who has done 24 Malayalam films, and also the British film In The Name Of God and the Tamil film Kannamma (2005). Reddy master does the choreography while L. Kesavan is the editor. The film launch was attended by KRG, Manickam Narayanan, Kaja Mydeen, Ibrahim Rowther, Abirami Ramanathan, Kalipuli G.Sekar and Riyaz Khan among others. Riyaz Khan revealed that he is playing the second hero in the film. "The film is a thriller and my character in the film is attracted by the fragrance of the heroine in the car she has sat in and left just before I enter. I don’t see her but only feel her presence through the fragrance. It’s a heroine oriented subject," he revealed. Riyaz Khan was later replaced by Ranjith. The scenes have been mainly shot in Munnar, Kodaikanal, Ooty and Thekkady.

Soundtrack

The film score and the soundtrack were composed by Devendran. The soundtrack, released in 2009, features 5 tracks with lyrics written by Piraisoodan, P. Vijay, Snehan and newcomer Muniyappa Raj.

References

2009 films
2000s Tamil-language films
Films shot in Kodaikanal
Films shot in Munnar
Films shot in Ooty
Indian thriller films
2009 directorial debut films
2009 thriller films
Films scored by Devendran